A what-not is a piece of furniture derived from the French étagère, which was exceedingly popular in England in the first three-quarters of the 19th century. It usually consists of slender uprights or pillars, supporting a series of shelves for holding china, ornaments, trifles, or "what nots", hence the allusive name. In its English form, it is a convenient piece of drawing room furniture, and was rarely valued for its aesthetic.

References 

Attribution:

History of furniture
Furniture
19th century in England
English furniture